In technical analysis in finance, a technical indicator is a mathematical calculation based on historic price, volume, or (in the case of futures contracts) open interest information that aims to forecast financial market direction.  Technical indicators are a fundamental part of technical analysis and are typically plotted as a chart pattern to try to predict the market trend.  Indicators generally overlay on price chart data to indicate where the price is going, or whether the price is in an "overbought" condition or an "oversold" condition.

Many technical indicators have been developed and new variants continue to be developed by traders with the aim of getting better results.  New Indicators are often backtested on historic price and volume data to see how effective they would have been to predict future events.

In the technical investigation, a bogus sign alludes to a sign of future value developments that gives an off base image of the financial reality. False signs may emerge because of various components, including timing slacks, inconsistencies in information sources, smoothing strategies or even the calculation by which the pointer is determined.
Technical analysis tries to capture market psychology and sentiment by analyzing price trends and chart patterns for possible trading opportunities.
Traders should be careful when taking trades solely based on indicators since they are not foolproof.

References

 
Indicators